Whispering Wind or Whispering Winds may refer to:

Music
 "Whispering Winds", an orchestral arrangement by Twilight Force from the 2014 album Tales of Ancient Prophecies
 "Whispering Wind", an album by Mary Rice Hopkins
 "Whispering Wind", a song by Ann Barnes
 "Whispering Wind", a song from Feet of Flames
 "Whispering Wind", a song by Green on Red from The Killer Inside Me
 "Whispering Wind", a song by Luba (then known as Lubomyra) from Lubomyra
 "Whispering Wind", a song by Moby from Play: The B Sides
 "The Whispering Wind", a song by Riders in the Sky from Always Drink Upstream from the Herd
 "The Whispering Wind (Blows On By)", a song by Mandy Barnett from I've Got a Right to Cry
 "Whispering Winds", a song from The Land Before Time V: The Mysterious Island
 "Whispering Winds", a 1952 song by Patti Page
 "Whispering Winds", a flute solo from Riverdance
 "Whispering Winds", a song composed by Corky Robbins

Films
 The Whispering Wind, a non-feature film which won the Best Anthropological / Ethnographic Film award at the 33rd National Film Awards
 Whispering Winds (film), a 1929 American film

Locations
 Whispering Winds, a ranch resided in by L. Ron Hubbard
 Whispering Winds, a unit of Camp Joe Scherman
 Whispering Winds Catholic Conference Center, a camp in Southern California, United States
 Whispering Winds Nudist Camp, host of the Starwood Festival

Schools
 Whispering Wind, an elementary school in the Paradise Valley Unified School District
 Whispering Winds Charter School, a school in Chiefland, Florida, in the district of the School Board of Levy County

Literature
 "Whispering Wind", a short story by Frederick Forsyth from The Veteran
 Whispering Wind, a 1957 memoir by Syd Kyle-Little and part of 20th century Australian outback literature
 Whispering Winds of Change: Perceptions of a New World, a 1993 book by Stuart Wilde

Other
 Whispering Wind, a boat which raced in the 1958 Star World Championships
 Whispering Wind, a character in 1998 Hong Kong film The Storm Riders and other related films
 Mountain of the Whispering Winds, a fictional mountain in 1970 Christmas special Santa Claus Is Comin' to Town